This page summarises the Australia national soccer team fixtures and results in 2006.

Summary
2006 was a historic year for the Men's National Team for a number of reasons. Football Federation Australia had been accepted into the Asian Football Confederation effective from 1 January and played their first fixture as an Asian member on 22 February when they travelled to Manama and defeated Bahrain 3-1 in an 2007 AFC Asian Cup qualification match. 

However the major event of the year was the 2006 FIFA World Cup and Australia had qualified for the first time since 1974. Prior to the tournament Australia defeated Greece in a 'farewell' game in front of 95,000 spectators in Melbourne. This was followed by two warm-up games drawing 1-1 with Netherlands and defeating Liechtenstein 3-1. 

On 12 June, Australia defeated Japan 3–1 in their opening game in Kaiserslautern, with Tim Cahill scoring two goals and John Aloisi scoring one in the last eight minutes to claim their first World Cup finals victory. Their goals were the first ever scored by Australia in the World Cup Finals.

Australia met Brazil in their second Group F game in Munich on 18 June. The Australians held Brazil to a 0–0 half time scoreline before Adriano put Brazil in front and substitute Fred scored to give Brazil a 2–0 win.

On 22 June, Australia faced Croatia in Stuttgart. The final score was 2–2. A goal from Darijo Srna in the second minute put Australia on the back foot. Australia equalised with a penalty goal from Craig Moore in the 38th minute after Croatian defender Stjepan Tomas handballed near the Croatian goal. Niko Kovac gave Croatia a 2–1 lead after halftime before Australia equalised again through Harry Kewell in the 79th minute. Towards the end of the match, referee Graham Poll blew the final whistle at the moment that John Aloisi scored what would have been a winning goal. As Brazil beat Japan 4–1, Australia proceeded to the next round to face Italy.

On 26 June, Australia met Italy in Kaiserslautern. Italy went down to 10 men due to the red card (51') given to Marco Materazzi for a two-footed tackle on Mark Bresciano. Almost three minutes into stoppage time, with the score still at 0–0 a penalty was awarded to Italy when Fabio Grosso fell under a Lucas Neill challenge in the final seconds of the match. Francesco Totti scored from the spot and the game ended immediately with Australia eliminated. The success achieved at the 2006 World Cup later saw the team named AFC National Team of the Year.

Australia ended the year with their remaining Asian Cup qualifications matches against Bahrain and Kuwait and qualified for the tournament by topping the group.

Record

Match results

Friendlies

World Cup

Note 1: Šimunić was given three yellow cards in the match: the referee (Graham Poll) failed to send him off the pitch after the second yellow, and was only red carded after the third yellow.

Asian Cup qualifiers

Goal scorers

References

2006 in Australian soccer
2006 national football team results
2006